Ulvella is a genus of endophytic microalgae in the family Ulvellaceae. Accepted species of Ulvella include Ulvella leptochaete

References

External links

Ulvales
Ulvophyceae genera